This is a list of places in the Torfaen county borough, south Wales.
__notoc__

Principal towns
Abersychan
Blaenafon
Cwmbran
Pontypool

Villages and other named communities
  Sebastopol
 Griffithstown
  Cwmafon
 Pontnewydd
 Pontnewynydd
 Croesyceiliog
 Llanyrafon
 Ponthir
 New Inn

References

 
Torfaen